David Lloyd (born 25 October 1965) is a former English professional squash player.

Lloyd was born on 25 October 1965 in Wolverhampton and became British Under-19 champion and runner-up in the World Junior Squash Championships in 1984. He participated in the British Open Squash Championships during the eighties.

References

External links
 

English male squash players
1965 births
Living people
sportspeople from Wolverhampton